The 1909 Lafayette football team represented Lafayette College in the 1909 college football season. Lafayette shut out seven of its eight opponents and finished with a 7–0–1 record in their first year under head coach Bob Folwell. Significant games included victories over Princeton (6–0) and Lehigh (21–0). The only blemish on the team's record was a 6–6 tie with Penn.  The 1909 Lafayette team outscored its opponents by a combined total of 176 to 6. Lafayette fullback George McCaa received recognition on the 1909 College Football All-America Team, as a third-team selection by Walter Camp and a second-team selection by The New York Times.

Schedule

References

Lafayette
Lafayette Leopards football seasons
College football undefeated seasons
Lafayette football